Central University of Technology, Free State or CUT is a University of Technology in Bloemfontein in the Free State province of South Africa. It was established in 1981 as "Technikon Free State". As part of the South African government's restructuring of tertiary education for the new millennium it was promoted to university of technology status.

Campus
The university has two campuses – one in Bloemfontein, the judicial capital of South Africa, and one in Welkom, in the heart of the Free State goldfields. The two campuses offer education opportunities in a number of technological fields, including science, technology, engineering and mathematics (STEM); management sciences; humanities; and education.

Academics
The Central University of Technology employs over 800 academic and research staff spread across four faculties.

Faculties

 Faculty of Engineering, Built Environment and Information Technology
 Faculty of Health and Environmental Sciences
 Faculty of Humanities
 Faculty of Management Sciences

Student enrollment
The qualifications on offer reside in four faculties, namely Faculty of Health and Environmental Sciences; Faculty of Humanities; Faculty of Engineering, Built Environment and Information Technology (IT); and Faculty of Management Sciences.  The university offers certificates and diplomas at undergraduate level, as well as advanced diplomas, postgraduate diplomas at honours level, and master's and doctoral degrees.

Ranking

RGEMS

RGEMS (Research Group in Evolvable Manufacturing Systems) is a research group within the Department of Electrical, Electronic and Computer Engineering at the Central University of Technology, Free State.

Established in 2006 by Prof. Herman Vermaak and Dr. Nicolaas Luwes.

The group has also participated in national competitions, such as the Siemens National Cyber Junkyard.

References

 

Public universities in South Africa
Universities in the Free State (province)
Educational institutions established in 1981
Education in Bloemfontein
Matjhabeng Local Municipality
1981 establishments in South Africa